McQuaig is a surname. Notable people with the surname include:

Jerry McQuaig (1912–2001), American baseball player
Linda McQuaig (born 1951), Canadian writer and journalist
Scott McQuaig (born 1960), American country singer-songwriter

See also
McQuaid